Sacramento New Technology High School is a small charter school based on the rings of New Tech Network's New Technology High Schools. It is part of the Sacramento City Unified School District and is located in South Sacramento.

History
Sacramento New Technology High School was established in 2003 on the site of Thurgood Marshall High School, an alternative high school during the 1990s. Prior to Thurgood Marshall, the site was home to Argonaut Alternative High School during the 1980s.

Affiliation
The school a New Tech Network (NTN) school. NTN is a school development organization, that helps public schools implement the "New Tech Model". This model is based on three key elements:
 Project-based learning (PBL) - This is the heart of the instructional approach. Teachers facilitate students' use collaborative methods of learning.
 Trust, Respect, and Responsibility - In this type of cultural environment, students decide how to allocate their time and team roles as opposed a traditional school setting where teachers are more involved in a student's time management.
 Smart use of Technology - With a one-to-one ratio of computer to student, the New Tech Learning Platform facilitates students and faculty to share projects online, collaborate, communicate, and conduct research.

There are currently dozens schools across the nation that have adopted this model. Sacramento New Technology High School, or SNTHS, regularly hosts administrators and faculty from other public schools to demonstrate the "New Tech Model". There are tours of the school conducted by student ambassadors.

The School and Curriculum
In 2010/2011 SNTHS had an estimated 350 networked computers. 90% are Windows-based, and 10% are Apple Mac OS. The Apple computers were implemented for the 2010/2011 school year in an effort to give students the opportunity to develop more graphic design-oriented skills. As of 2021/2022, Every student is issued a personal Chromebook, which the previously mentioned statistics do not account for. Along with the conventional math, language, and social science courses found at other high schools, this effectively expanded the current digital media course offering. SNTHS also houses a fully digital ProTools music studio, a state of the art multi-media and multi-purpose room, and interactive whiteboards in every classroom.

References

External links 

 
 New Tech Network 

High schools in Sacramento, California
Charter high schools in California
2003 establishments in California